Pieszowola  is a village in the administrative district of Gmina Sosnowica, within Parczew County, Lublin Voivodeship, in eastern Poland.

References

Pieszowola